Royal Air Force Station Tuddenham or RAF Tuddenham is a former Royal Air Force station located  south east of Mildenhall, Suffolk, England and  north west of Bury St Edmunds, Suffolk.

Station history
 No. 3 Lancaster Finishing School.
 No. 90 Squadron RAF starting on 13 October 1943 with the Short Stirling III before changing to the Avro Lancaster I and III in May 1944 and leaving on 11 November 1946 to RAF Wyton.
 No. 138 Squadron RAF between 9 March 1945 and 12 November 1946 with the Avro Lancaster I and III before moving to RAF Wyton.
 No. 149 Squadron RAF between 29 April 1946 and 4 November 1946 with the Avro Lancaster I and III.
 No. 186 Squadron RAF reformed at RAF Tuddenham on 1 October 1944 with the Lancaster I and III before moving to RAF Stradishall on 17 December 1945 where the squadron disbanded on 17 July 1945.
 No. 207 Squadron RAF used the airfield between 29 April 1946 and 8 November 1946 with the Lancaster I and III.
 No. 281 Maintenance Unit.

Post war
[USAF 3114th Ammo Supply Squadron] <Munitions storage and refurbishment. 1955–1959. Reestablished when the 8 th Air Force returned to RAF Lakenheath. About 100 USAF airmen in refurbished barracks. A small RAF contingent for munitions disposal. Bombs in runways marked with large X. Small arms stored in hangars.
 No. 107 Squadron RAF - PGM-17 Thor nuclear missiles.

Current use
The site is now used for farming and Gunman Airsoft.

See also
List of former Royal Air Force stations

References

Citations

Bibliography

Royal Air Force stations in Suffolk
Military units and formations established in 1941
Airports in England
Royal Air Force stations of World War II in the United Kingdom